Ulster Prince or prince of Ulster, may refer to:

 "Prince of Ulster", an aristocratic title held by The O'Neill, see King of Ulster
 , a pre-WWII passenger ferry running between Belfast and Liverpool
 , a passenger ferry that was called "Ulster Prince" in the post-WWII period
 , a mid-20th-century car-and-passenger ferry running the Irish Sea route
 , a WWII British Royal Navy troop ship

See also

 Earl of Ulster 
 
 Prince (disambiguation)
 Ulster (disambiguation)